The Flame is a 1984 album by British singer Annabel Lamb. The album was produced by Lamb's husband Wally Brill, and David Anderle.

Aside from lead vocals, Lamb sings backing vocals on the album as well as plays the keyboards. All songs on the album were written by Lamb with the exception of "Inside of My Head", which was written by Jim Rawcliffe.

Track listing
All tracks composed by Annabel Lamb; except where indicated
 "Sacraments of Love"
 "Hands of the Hunter"
 "Weapon of Love"
 "Dream Boy"
 "What the Eye Sees"
 "Things That I Fear"
 "The Flame"
 "So Lucky in Bed"
 "Inside of My Head" (Jim Rawcliffe)
 "Talking to Me"

Personnel
Annabel Lamb - vocals, keyboards, background vocals
Chris Jarrett - guitar
Kurt McGettrick - tenor saxophone
Jim Dvořák - trumpet
Robin Langridge - keyboards, background vocals
Richard Gibbs - keyboards
Alan Hodgson - drums
Richie Stevens - drums
Steve Greetham - bass
Scott Breadman - percussion
Jo Ann Harris - background vocals
Troyé Davenport - background vocals
Judy Brown - background vocals
Nancy Shanks - background vocals

Reissue
In 2008, Cherry Red Records reissued a UK 15-track digitally remastered CD album. The album was expanded with 5 bonus recordings and a picture booklet containing sleevenotes, a discography and lyrics.

2008 reissue track listing:
 "Sacraments of Love"
 "Hands of the Hunter"
 "Weapon of Love"
 "Dream Boy"
 "What the Eye Sees"
 "Things That I Fear"
 "The Flame"
 "So Lucky in Bed"
 "Inside of My Head"
 "Talking to Me"

Bonus recordings:
 "So Lucky in Bed" (12" version)
 "Venezuela"
 "Sisters of Mercy"
 "Riders on the Storm" (12" version)
 "No Cure"

References

1984 albums
Annabel Lamb albums
Albums produced by David Anderle
A&M Records albums